Humanitarian daily rations (HDRs) are food rations manufactured in the United States intended to be supplied to civilians and other non-military personnel in humanitarian crises.
They have shelf-lives of about 3 years, and their contents are designed to be acceptable to a variety of religious and ethnic groups. The meals cost approximately one-fifth of the cost of a Meal, Ready-to-Eat (MRE). The rations were first used in Bosnia in 1993.

From the time they were created and used in 1993 until November 2001, HDRs were packaged with a bright yellow outer plastic covering; this choice of color, however, proved to be problematic in areas of the world where cluster bombs were being used, as the bombs were the exact same shade of yellow and recipients of the rations sometimes confused the ration package for undetonated cluster bombs, often spotting the bright color from a distance and making an incorrect assumption; this prompted the United States Federal Government to reissue the packages with a deep salmon pink outer covering to distinguish them from the bombs (this color has been used in the HDR manufacturing process ever since).

The meals are designed to be able to survive being air-dropped without a parachute.
This is safer for refugees than parachuting large pallets of rations, as well as preventing meal hoarding by those able to seize a single, large delivery.

HDRs are also made available through organizations such as The Salvation Army to aid victims of poverty in the United States, and were distributed during Hurricane Katrina and Hurricane Rita to victims of the disasters by the Federal Emergency Management Agency (FEMA).

Packaging and distribution

The HDR packages are delivered in cases of packages, each containing a small selection of food items based on predetermined menus and an accessory pack containing red pepper, pepper, salt, sugar, spoon, matches, an alcohol-free moist towelette, and a napkin.

HDRs are typically air-dropped into the disaster area on large pallets. The HDRs initially dropped in Afghanistan were yellow before it was realized that the packages were the same color as the bomblets in American cluster bombs, which were also dropped in Afghanistan.  Later packages were covered in salmon colored foil.

HDRs produced by the United States are manufactured by the same companies that produce MREs designed for the United States Armed Forces. Like MREs, the food components are designed so they can be consumed without requiring additional preparation, including cooking. They do not, however, include flameless ration heaters, which are found in MREs.

Typical contents
 Main entrée, two of:
 Lentil or barley stew
 Yellow or herb rice
 Red beans and rice
 Beans and rice with tomato sauce
 Peas in tomato sauce
 Beans with potatoes
 Shortbread
 Fig bar
 Vegetable crackers
 Peanut butter
 Strawberry jam
 Fruit pastry (much like a Pop-tart)
 Accessory Pack containing:
 Book of matches (unprinted)
 Salt, pepper and sugar packets
 Packet of crushed red pepper
 Moist towelette (alcohol-free)
 Paper napkin
 Plastic spoon

Specifications

United States program in Afghanistan
On October 15, 2001, the United States announced a humanitarian daily ration for Afghanistan.

On October 24, 2001, Rear Admiral John Stufflebeem announced fears that the Taliban planned to poison American food aid.
Stufflebeem said that since the program had been started on October 7, 2001 the United States had dropped 785,000 rations.

See also
 BP-5 Compact Food

References

External links

HDR factsheet by the Defense Logistics Agency
A list of menus

Military food
Instant foods and drinks